Acidulants are chemical compounds that give a tart, sour, or acidic flavor to foods or enhance the perceived sweetness of foods. Acidulants can also function as leavening agents and emulsifiers in some kinds of processed foods. Though acidulants can lower pH they do differ from acidity regulators, which are food additives specifically intended to modify the stability of food or enzymes within it.  Typical acidulants are acetic acid (e.g. in pickles) and citric acid.  Many beverages, such as colas, contain phosphoric acid.  Sour candies often are formulated with malic acid. Other acidulants used in food production include: fumaric acid, tartaric acid, lactic acid and gluconic acid.

See also
Food additive
List of food additives
Sour sanding

References

External links
"Acidulants in Food", FAIA.org.UK.

Food additives
Food technology